Kalošević is a village in the municipalities of Teslić (Republika Srpska) and Tešanj, Bosnia and Herzegovina.

Demographics 
According to the 2013 census, its population was 1,179, with 1,154 living in the Tešanj part and 25 living in the Teslić part.

References

Populated places in Tešanj
Populated places in Teslić